Mont-Dore (Mont Dòr in Auvergnat,  and Mont-Dore-les-Bains), in common usage Le Mont-Dore, is a commune in the Puy-de-Dôme department in Auvergne-Rhône-Alpes in central France.

Geography
The Monts Dore close the valley towards the south.

Thermal springs

The thermal springs of Mont-Dore, now numbering twelve, were known to the Romans. Sodium bicarbonate, iron and arsenic are the principal ingredients of the waters, which are used both for drinking and bathing. Hot baths are characteristic of the treatment; they are believed to be efficacious for tuberculosis, bronchitis, asthma, and nervous and rheumatic paralysis. Due to the elevation and exposure of the valley, the climate of Mont-Dore is relatively severe, and the season only lasts from 15 June to 15 September. The bath-house was rebuilt in 1891–1894.

Ski resort
Mont-Dore is a ski resort with runs on the slopes of the Puy de Sancy and the Puy Ferrand. Thirty runs account for 42 km of downhill skiing, served by a number of lifts of different types. There are also 25 km of cross-country trails.

Sights
In the town park, along the Dordogne, relics of the old Roman baths have been collected. The surrounding country, with its fir woods, pastures, waterfalls and mountains, is very attractive. To the south is the Puy de Sancy (1,886 m), the loftiest peak of central France.

Gallery

See also

Communes of the Puy-de-Dôme department

References

Communes of Puy-de-Dôme
Spa towns in France